is a train station in Toyono, Toyono District,  Osaka Prefecture, Japan.
The station name translates loosely to: Entrance to Miyoken Mountain (Miyokenzan). The whole mountain is a spiritual complex that includes Miyoken no Mori where there is a cable car, family barbecue area, scenic chair lift and finally, the temple which is known as Nose Miyokenzan, which can trace its history back to 1603, which is considered the beginning of the Tokugawa Bakufu, or Edo Era.

Lines
Nose Electric Railway
Myōken Line

Adjacent stations

Railway stations in Osaka Prefecture
Stations of Nose Electric Railway
Railway stations in Japan opened in 1923